Davor Jelaska (25 November 1907 – 5 December 1995) was a Croatian rower. He competed in the men's single sculls event at the 1936 Summer Olympics. He was a coach of golden Men's Coxless Four in Helsinki.

References

External links
 

1907 births
1995 deaths
Croatian male rowers
Olympic rowers of Yugoslavia
Rowers at the 1936 Summer Olympics
Rowers from Split, Croatia
Burials at Lovrinac Cemetery